The 1996–97 Marquette Golden Eagles men's basketball team represented the Marquette University in the 1996–97 season. The Golden Eagles finished the regular season with a record of 22–9.

Roster

Schedule

|-
!colspan=9 style=| Conference USA tournament

|-
!colspan=9 style=| NCAA tournament

Team players drafted into the NBA

External links
MUScoop's MUWiki

References 

Marquette
Marquette Golden Eagles men's basketball seasons
Marquette
Marq
Marq